Adebola Olurotimi "Ade"  Jimoh (born April 18, 1980) is a former American football cornerback.  He was signed by the Washington Redskins as an undrafted free agent in 2003.  He played college football at Utah State University.

Jimoh has also been a member of the Chicago Bears and New England Patriots. His name "Adebola" means "Crown meets wealth" in the Yoruba language

Early years
Jimoh grew up in Canoga Park and attended El Camino Real High School where he was a two-year letterman and a second-team all-league selection, as well as a preseason third-team all-area pick.  In his senior year, his team won the city championship.

College career
Jimoh played college football for Utah State University.  He started all 11 games at left corner his sophomore year in 2000 and earned second-team All-Big West honors as well as the team's outstanding defensive back.  He also shared the team lead with two interceptions and had a team-high 12 pass deflections and a blocked kick.  He started nine games at cornerback in 2001 and registered 39 tackles and an interception.  He played in all 11 games for the Aggies in 2002 and recorded one interception for three yards and 53 tackles (34 solo).

Professional career

Washington Redskins
Jimoh was signed by the Redskins in April 2003 as an undrafted rookie free agent.  In 2003, Jimoh appeared in all 16 games with the Redskins as a reserve cornerback but mostly on special teams coverage units.  In 2004, he appeared in 15 games as a reserve cornerback and was a valued special teams player, recording 20 special teams tackles on the season, tied for third-best on the team.  His season was cut short late in the year when he suffered a season-ending knee injury.  In 2005, he played in all 16 games and two playoff games, mostly as a reserve cornerback and special teams leader.  He finished with ten tackles (nine solo) and 20 special teams tackles, fifth-best on the team.

Chicago Bears
On September 11, 2007, the Chicago Bears signed Jimoh to assist with special teams, due to the promotion of kick returner Danieal Manning to take the place of injured starting safety Mike Brown.  Between September 16, 2007 and September 24, 2007, Jimoh was twice waived and then re-signed a few days later to make room for fill-in punter Dirk Johnson.

Jimoh suffered a broken collarbone on November 18, 2007 while playing on special teams.  He was placed on injured reserve, ending his season.

New England Patriots
On August 13, 2008 Jimoh was signed by the New England Patriots.  He was assigned No. 43 in New England.  He was released on August 21 after the team signed offensive lineman Mike Flynn.

References

External links

Chicago Bears bio
New England Patriots bio
Washington Redskins bio

1980 births
Living people
American football cornerbacks
Chicago Bears players
New England Patriots players
Players of American football from Los Angeles
Utah State Aggies football players
Washington Redskins players
American sportspeople of Nigerian descent
American people of Yoruba descent
Yoruba sportspeople
El Camino Real High School alumni